The Crown Jeweller is responsible for the maintenance of the Crown Jewels of the United Kingdom, and is appointed by the British monarch. The current Crown Jeweller is Mark Appleby, who was appointed in 2017.

History
The post was created in 1843 by Queen Victoria, who issued a royal warrant to Garrard & Co., and the title of Crown Jeweller was vested in an employee of the company. Until then, Rundell & Bridge, who advertised themselves as Crown jewellers, had been responsible for maintaining and preparing Jewels for use at state occasions. If the title had existed before 1843, it would have applied to William Jones of Jefferys & Jones (1782–96), Philip Gilbert of Jefferys, Jones & Gilbert (1797–1820), and Rundell & Bridge (1821–43). Before 1782, the work of repairing and making the Crown Jewels was distributed to various goldsmiths and jewellers on an ad-hoc basis.

David V. Thomas (1991–2007) stated that he had been always on call, ready to attend to the Jewels. William Summers, the sixth Crown Jeweller (1962–91), said of his job: "Where the Crown goes, there go I".

In 2007, Garrard & Co. were replaced, the reason given that it was time for a change. The company had been acquired by a private equity firm in 2006. Harry Collins of the family business G. Collins & Sons, who was also Queen Elizabeth II's personal jeweller, was appointed the new Crown Jeweller. In 2012, Collins stepped down from the role and Martin Swift of Mappin & Webb became the Crown Jeweller. In 2017 he was replaced by Mark Appleby, the head of Mappin & Webb's jewellery workshop.

List of Crown Jewellers
1843: Sebastian Garrard
George Whitford
Henry Bell
C. E. Newbigin
1910: Cecil Mann
1962: William Summers
1991: David V. Thomas
2007: Harry Collins
2012: Martin Swift
2017: Mark Appleby

See also
 Keeper of the Jewel House

Notes

References

Further reading

External links
David Thomas in a clip from Monarchy: The Royal Family at Work (2007)

British monarchy
Positions within the British Royal Household